Sidney Wilfred Scott (20 July 1900 – 17 September 1970) was a New Zealand communist, journalist and editor.

Biography
He was born in Ifield, Sussex, England in 1900.

On 14 July 1928 police seized books and papers of "seditious nature" from his home on Onehunga. He was charged with possession of books with intention for sale or distribution, and with importing books which advocated violence. Scott admitted to two charges and pleaded not guilty on the third, but was convicted of it regardless. The third charge related to a communist training manual published by the Communist Party of Australia. Upon conviction, he was fined £14 (around $1400 in 2019).

References

1900 births
1970 deaths
New Zealand communists
British emigrants to New Zealand
New Zealand editors
New Zealand magazine editors
People from Crawley
New Zealand politicians convicted of crimes
Blind politicians
20th-century New Zealand journalists
New Zealand blind people